The men's 800 metres at the 2012 IAAF World Indoor Championships will be held at the Ataköy Athletics Arena on 9 and 11 March. The gold medal was won by 18-year-old Mohammed Aman of Ethiopia, in a time of 1:48.36 seconds.

In the 800 metres final there were 6 competitors all from different nations. Jakub Holuša had run the fastest time in the semi-final (1:47.23) placing in front of the gold medalist, Mohammed Aman. Going into the final Adam Kszczot was the favourite to win the race. At the end of the first lap Kszczot was leading and looking to pull away from the pack. At the 400 metre mark Kszczot was still winning the race after coming through with a time of 56.29 seconds. Kszczot kept his lead until the 700 metre mark where Mohammed Aman made a move and overtook him. Holuša and Osagie followed  suite and also overtook Kszczot on the home strait.

Medalists

Records

Qualification standards

Schedule

Results

Heats

Qualification: First 2 (Q) plus the 6 fastest times qualified (q)

Semi-final

Qualification: First 2 of each heat qualified (Q)

Final

6 athletes from 6 countries participated.  The final started at 16:20.

References

800 metres
800 metres at the World Athletics Indoor Championships